Asaji Kobayashi (10 January 1898 – 5 August 1939) was a Japanese painter. His work was part of the painting event in the art competition at the 1936 Summer Olympics. He committed suicide by jumping from a bridge in 1939.

References

1898 births
1939 suicides
20th-century Japanese painters
Olympic competitors in art competitions
People from Nagano Prefecture
Suicides by jumping in Japan